Orthomegas jaspideus is a species of beetle in the family Cerambycidae. It is found in Brazil, Paraguay and Argentina.

References

Beetles described in 1844
Prioninae